Martine Beaugrand is a Canadian politician, who was acclaimed as the new interim mayor of Laval, Quebec on July 3, 2013 following the resignation of Alexandre Duplessis. She is the city's first female mayor.

Beaugrand was first elected to Laval City Council in the 2009 municipal election, representing the Fabreville ward as a member of the Parti PRO des Lavallois, and has sat as an independent councillor since the party's dissolution in 2012. She was one of only two city councillors, along with France Dubreuil, who was not alleged to have been involved in the municipal corruption scandal that has affected the city since the resignation of Gilles Vaillancourt in 2012.

She did not run for another term in the 2013 municipal election.

References

Mayors of Laval, Quebec
Living people
Women mayors of places in Quebec
Year of birth missing (living people)